The 1947 Norwegian Football Cup was the 42nd season of the Norwegian annual knockout football tournament. The tournament was open for all members of NFF, except those from Northern Norway. The final was played at Brann Stadion in Bergen on 19 October 1947, and Skeid secured their first title with a 2-0 win against Viking. Skeid had previously played two cup finals but lost both in 1939 and 1940, while it was Viking's second appearance in the final, having previously lost in 1933. Lyn were the defending champions, but were eliminated by Brann in the fourth round.

First round

|-
|colspan="3" style="background-color:#97DEFF"|Replay

|}

Second round

|-
|colspan="3" style="background-color:#97DEFF"|Replay

|}

Third round

|colspan="3" style="background-color:#97DEFF"|17 August 1947

|-
|colspan="3" style="background-color:#97DEFF"|Replay: 24 August 1947

|}

Fourth round

|colspan="3" style="background-color:#97DEFF"|31 August 1947

|}

Quarter-finals

|colspan="3" style="background-color:#97DEFF"|14 September 1947

|}

Semi-finals

|colspan="3" style="background-color:#97DEFF"|28 September 1947

|-
|colspan="3" style="background-color:#97DEFF"|Replay: 12 October 1947

|}

Final

Skeid (2-3-5):

Petter Due - Sigurd Smestad, Gustav Rehn - Knut Andersen, John Bøhling, Willy Sundblad - Henry Mathiesen, Brede Borgen, Hans Nordahl, Paul Sætrang, Kjell Anker Hanssen

Viking (2-3-5):

Torgeir Torgersen - Karsten Johannessen, Tonning Skjæveland - Arthur Wilsgård, Thore Thu, Lauritz Abrahamsen - Inge Paulsen, Gunnar Stensland, Ragnar Paulsen, William Danielsen, Georg Monsen

See also
1947 in Norwegian football

References

Norwegian Football Cup seasons
Norway
Cup